Ice Cream in the Cupboard is a 2019 American independent biographical romantic drama film directed by Drew Pollins and starring Dana Ashbrook, Claudia Ferri, Jaime King, Tobin Bell, Andrea Londo and Garrett Mercer.  It is based on the book by Pat Moffett. The film premiered at the 2019 Rhode Island International Film Festival, where it won Best Feature Film – Narrative.

Plot Summary
After Pat (Dana Ashbrook) is attacked by his wife Carmen (Claudia Ferri), his world begins to unravel as he comes to terms with her diagnosis of early-onset Alzheimer's disease.

Cast
Jaime King as Dr. Giselle Cohen
Tobin Bell as Pop
Dana Ashbrook as Pat
Sean Whalen as Doug Hannigan
Amber Frank as Lydia
Claudia Ferri as Carmen
Andrea Londo as Young Carmen
Garrett Mercer as Young Pat

References

External links
 
 

American independent films
American romantic drama films
American biographical drama films
2019 drama films
2019 independent films
2010s English-language films
2010s American films